Mihály Petrovszky (26 December 1950 – 29 August 2018) was a Hungarian judoka. He competed at the 1972 Summer Olympics and the 1976 Summer Olympics.

References

External links
 

1950 births
2018 deaths
Hungarian male judoka
Olympic judoka of Hungary
Judoka at the 1972 Summer Olympics
Judoka at the 1976 Summer Olympics
People from Békéscsaba
Sportspeople from Békés County
20th-century Hungarian people